Shellabarger is a surname. Notable people with the surname include:

M. Elizabeth Shellabarger (1879–1967), American Red Cross nurse
Samuel Shellabarger (1888–1954), American educator and writer
Samuel Shellabarger (1817–1896), American politician